Dame Alison Burns Quentin-Baxter  (née Souter, born 28 December 1929) is a retired New Zealand constitutional lawyer. She advised a number of small island states on the drafting of their constitutional documents.

Early life 
Quentin-Baxter was born in Auckland on 28 December 1929, and grew up there. Both her sets of grandparents were farmers and she spent many holidays on their farms in the Waikato and Kaipara. She attended Nga Tawa Diocesan School for her last years of secondary schooling, and studied law at the University of Auckland where she became chair of the students' law society in her final year, the first woman to hold the position. On graduation, she declined an offer of a position in a leading city firm and instead applied to the Department of External Affairs for a job, as she was interested in international affairs and government. She was successful and started working in the department in 1951.

Career 
In the early 1950s,  Quentin-Baxter represented New Zealand in New York on the Legal Committee of the UN General Assembly, and was part of a New Zealand delegation to conferences in Geneva on maritime law. In 1956, she was promoted to head of the department's legal division, a position she held until 1960 when she was posted to Washington, D.C., as the first secretary in the New Zealand Embassy.

In late 1961, Quentin-Baxter resigned from her position as she was engaged, and married women did not normally continue in paid work at that time. She spent two years in Tokyo with her new husband then returned to Wellington, where she began teaching law at a polytechnic college. From 1967 to 1969, she taught constitutional history and law in the faculty of law at Victoria University of Wellington.

In 1970, Quentin-Baxter's husband was appointed a constitutional adviser to the Niue Island Assembly, and she accompanied him and assisted him with the work of drafting a new constitution for the country. In 1974, the Niue Constitution Act was passed, incorporating the work of them both. Ten years later, in 1984, Quentin-Baxter was appointed to the Niue Review Group and the Niue Public Service Commission.

From 1977 to 1979, Quentin-Baxter served as counsel to the Marshall Islands Constitutional Conventions, and from 2002 to 2004 she served as an independent constitutional adviser to the members of the St. Helena Legislative Council. She also advised the Fiji Constitution Review Commission from 1995 to 1996.

In addition to these international roles, Quentin-Baxter was the director of the New Zealand Law Commission from 1987 to 1994.

Publications 
In 2017, This Realm of New Zealand: The Sovereign, the Governor-General, the Crown co-written with Janet McLean, was published.

Honours and awards 
In the 1993 Queen's Birthday Honours, Quentin-Baxter was appointed a Companion of the Queen's Service Order for public services. In 2003, she was awarded an honorary doctorate of Laws by Victoria University of Wellington.

In the 2007 Queen's Birthday Honours, Quentin-Baxter was appointed a Distinguished Companion of the New Zealand Order of Merit, for services to the law. In 2009, following the restoration of titular honours by the New Zealand government, she accepted redesignation as a Dame Companion of the New Zealand Order of Merit.

References

Sources 
 

1929 births
Living people
People from Auckland
New Zealand women lawyers
20th-century New Zealand lawyers
University of Auckland alumni
Academic staff of the Victoria University of Wellington
Dames Companion of the New Zealand Order of Merit
Companions of the Queen's Service Order
People educated at Nga Tawa Diocesan School
20th-century women lawyers